Togo station is a railway station in Togo, Saskatchewan, Canada. It serves as a flag stop for Via Rail's Winnipeg–Churchill train. The station contains a heated and wheelchair accessible shelter.

References

External links 
Via Rail Station Information

Via Rail stations in Saskatchewan